Žabnica is a village south of Kranj in the Upper Carniola region of Slovenia.

Church

The parish church in the village is dedicated to Saint Ulrich and belongs to the Archdiocese of Ljubljana.

References

External links

Žabnica on Geopedia

Populated places in the City Municipality of Kranj